Playboy Motor Car Corporation was a Buffalo, New York-based automobile company, established in 1947. Playboy offered a small, one seating row convertible, which was one of the first to come standard from factory with a multi-part, retractable hardtop.

The company only made 99 cars including 1 prototype, 97 finished serial numbered production cars, as well as 1 unfinished car numbered 98 which has survived with zero miles on the odometer (99 cars total), before going bankrupt in 1951.

The company
Company founder Lou Horwitz was a Packard dealer who after World War 2 saw a need for a new smaller car for postwar America, a cheaper car than the Packards he sold. It would be built from outsourced parts and cost around $900. Horwitz recruited friends Norm Richardson (a skilled mechanic) and Charlie Thomas (a former Pontiac engineer).
In the wake of Preston Tucker's bad press they had difficulty forming a dealer network, and only finished 97 production cars before declaring bankruptcy in 1951.

The Playboy convertible prototype

The original prototype shares the same general shape as the production model, but features a rear mounted engine layout and a soft folding top.

The Playboy prototype today
It is owned and has been restored by company founder Lou Horwitz's grandson David Kaplan. According to Kaplan, "The black one never had an official number. When I restored it I put a PR on it for prototype." and "I finished it in the early '90s and I don't drive it much but I do drive it."

The Playboy convertible production model

The Playboy had a  Continental four-cylinder sidevalve engine driving a three-speed manual transmission. It would get . It would accelerate from 0- in six seconds, and 0- in 17 seconds.

It was offered as a three-passenger convertible with a folding steel top. (A station wagon was planned, but never built.)

Under-capitalized, Playboy could not compete with better-financed companies offering more conventional cars.

Playboy cars today
Of 97 production cars sold, only about 43 are believed to survive today. Five (including the prototype) are owned by David Kaplan, grandson of company founder Lou Horwitz. Today Kaplan is an authority on his grandfather's car.

See also
 List of defunct United States automobile manufacturers
 List of car manufacturers of the United States
 List of New York companies

Notes

Sources
Flory,  J. "Kelly", Jr. American Cars 1946-1959. Jefferson, NC:  McFarland & Coy, 2008.

External links
 http://www.playboymotorcars.com/
Short lived/Odd vehicle collection from Chuck's Toyland
Huntsville Rewound feature about Keller Automobiles (18 made/3 exist)

Automotive companies established in 1947
Defunct motor vehicle manufacturers of the United States
Defunct manufacturing companies based in New York (state)
Manufacturing companies based in Buffalo, New York
Vehicle manufacturing companies disestablished in 1951
1947 establishments in New York (state)
Motor vehicle manufacturers based in New York (state)
1951 disestablishments in New York (state)